is a town located in Kashima District, Ishikawa Prefecture, Japan. , the town had an estimated population of 18,278 in 6,625 households, and a population density of 84 persons per km2.

Geography
Nakanoto occupies the base of Noto Peninsula and is bordered by Toyama Prefecture to the south. Natural features of Nakanoto include Mount Sekidou and Fudo waterfall. It is one and a half hours from Kanazawa by train. Nakanoto has a humid continental climate (Köppen Cfa) characterized by mild summers and cold winters with heavy snowfall.  The average annual temperature in Nakanoto is 13.7 °C. The average annual rainfall is 2411 mm with September as the wettest month. The temperatures are highest on average in August, at around 26.1 °C, and lowest in January, at around 2.8 °C.

Neighbouring municipalities
Ishikawa Prefecture
Nanao
Shika
Hakui
Toyama Prefecture
Himi

Demographics
Per Japanese census data, the population of Nakanoto has declined over the past 50 years.

History
The area around Nakanoto was part of ancient Noto Province. During the Sengoku Period (1467–1568), the area was contested between the Hatakeyama clan, Uesugi clan and Maeda clan, with the area becoming part of Kaga Domain under the Edo period Tokugawa shogunate.  Following the Meiji restoration, the area was organised into Kashima District, Ishikawa.

The town was founded on March 1, 2005 from the merger of three towns in the district: Kashima, Rokusei, and Toriya.

Education
Nakanoto has three public elementary schools and one public middle school operated by the town government, and one public high school operated by the Ishikawa Prefectural Board of Education.

Transportation

Railway
  West Japan Railway Company - Nanao Line
 -  -  -

Highway

Local attractions
 Amanomiya Kofun Cluster

References

External links

  

 
Towns in Ishikawa Prefecture